"Music Gets the Best of Me" is a song by British singer-songwriter Sophie Ellis-Bextor, released as the fourth and final single from her debut solo album, Read My Lips (2001). The single was one of two new tracks that appeared on the re-issue of the album in 2002, along with previous single "Get Over You". The song peaked at number 14 on the UK Singles Chart and number 15 in Italy and Romania. Two music videos were made for the song.

Music video
There are two different music videos for the song. Both are directed by Sophie Muller. The first shows Ellis-Bextor in a tropical seaside setting, singing, playing, and dancing in daylight, both on the beach and in the water; at the end, she is at a night carnival. In much of the video, she wears headphones, as if listening to music. This video was the one released for television. The second video shows Ellis-Bextor going in to a dinner party uninvited; she puts on a CD and begins to perform, going from room to room; and ends by claiming that she had fun and leaving. This version was featured as an extra on her home video Watch My Lips.

Track listings

UK CD1
 "Music Gets the Best of Me" 
 "Music Gets the Best of Me" 
 "Is It Any Wonder" 

UK CD2
 "Music Gets the Best of Me" 
 "Groovejet (If This Ain't Love)" 
 "Everything Falls into Busface"

UK cassette single
 "Music Gets the Best of Me" 
 "Groovejet (If This Ain't Love)" 

European CD single
 "Music Gets the Best of Me" 
 "Music Gets the Best of Me" 

Australian CD single
 "Music Gets the Best of Me" 
 "Music Gets the Best of Me" 
 "Get Over You" 
 "Murder on the Dancefloor" 
 "Is It Any Wonder" 
 "Everything Falls into Busface"

Credits and personnel
Credits are lifted from the Read My Lips album booklet.

Studios
 Recorded at Mayfair Studios (London, England)
 Mastered at Sony Music Studios (London, England)

Personnel

 Sophie Ellis-Bextor – writing
 Matt Rowe – writing, production
 Gregg Alexander – writing, production
 Stefan Skarbek – programming
 Steve Osborne – production
 Jeremy Wheatley – additional production and mix
 Rik Simpson – engineering
 John Davis – mastering

Charts

Weekly charts

Year-end charts

Release history

References

2001 songs
2002 singles
Music videos directed by Sophie Muller
Polydor Records singles
Song recordings produced by Gregg Alexander
Songs about music
Songs written by Gregg Alexander
Songs written by Matt Rowe (songwriter)
Songs written by Sophie Ellis-Bextor
Sophie Ellis-Bextor songs